Khar may refer to:

Places 
 Khar, Mumbai, a suburb of Mumbai, India
 Khar, Punjab, a town in the Punjab Province, Pakistan
 Khar, Bajaur, a town in the Bajaur Agency of the Federally Administered Tribal Areas, Pakistan
 Khar, Nepal, a village in Darchula District, Nepal

Names 
 Khar (tribe) a  tribe in South Punjab
 Hina Rabbani Khar (born 1977), foreign minister of Pakistan
 Ghulam Mustafa Khar (born 1937), former governor of Punjab province in Pakistan

Other uses 
 KHAR, a radio station in Anchorage, Alaska, United States
 Khar, an Ancient Egyptian unit of measurement used for volume
 Khar, an Ancient Egyptian term used to designate the geographical region encompassing Canaan and Syria

See also
 Khar Lake (disambiguation)
 Khara (disambiguation)
 Kar (disambiguation)